Geomdansan is a mountain located in Seongnam, and Gwangju, Gyeonggi Province, South Korea.

See also
Geography of Korea
List of mountains in Korea
List of mountains by elevation
Mountain portal
South Korea portal

References

Mountains of Gwangju
Mountains of Gyeonggi Province
Seongnam
Mountains of South Korea